Nadia Chilkovsky Nahumck (born January 8, 1908, Kiev, Russian Empire – died April 23, 2006, Blue Bell, Pennsylvania) was a pioneer in modern dance, dance pedagogy and Labanotation.

History
She began her dance studies in Philadelphia in 1924 at Riva Hoffman's studio. Hoffman was a proponent of Isadora Duncan's dance style. Nahumck danced with the Irma Duncan company from 1930–31 and was well known as a premier Duncan dancer. In 1929 she moved to New York City and studied with Hanya Holm, Mary Wigman, Martha Graham, Louis Horst, and at Anna Duncan's studio. In 1931 Nahumck co-founded the New Dance Group.

She returned from New York to Philadelphia around 1943. The next year she established her own dance school, the Philadelphia Dance Academy, which incorporated modern, folk, ballet, Duncan and other dance traditions, as well as Labanotation. Nahumck's Philadelphia Dance Academy was absorbed by the Philadelphia College of the Performing Arts in 1977 and continues today as the University of the Arts School of Dance.

Husband
Nadia Chilkovsky wed Nicholas Nahumck in 1941; he died in 1993.

Death
Nadia Chilkovsky Nahumck died in 2006, aged 98, at the Sunrise Senior Living Center in Blue Bell, Pennsylvania.

References

Sources
 The University of the Arts University Libraries. University of the Arts Name Changes
Dunning, Jennifer. "Nadia Chilkovsky Nahumck, 98, Dancer" (obituary), "New York Times", April 29, 2006
Garafola, Lynn, ed. "Of, By, and For the People: Dancing on the Left in the 1930s". Madison, WI: Society of Dance History Scholars, 1994.
International Encyclopedia of Dance: A Project of Dance Perspectives, Inc. New York: Oxford University Press, 1998. See index under Chilkovsky and under Nahumck.
Lloyd, Margaret. The Borzoi Book of Modern Dance. New York: Alfred A. Knopf, 1949.
"N. C. Nahumck, 98, dance innovator" (obituary), Philadelphia Inquirer, May 1, 2006, p. B14
Foulkes, Julia L. "'Angels Rewolt!': Jewish Women in Modern Dance in the 1930s." American Jewish History, v. 88, no. 2 (June 2000), pp. 233–252.
Kevles, Barbara. "A 20th Century School of Dance.", Dance Magazine, v. 38 (May 1964), pp. 20–22.

1908 births
2006 deaths
American female dancers
American people of Russian-Jewish descent
Dancers from Kyiv
People from Montgomery County, Pennsylvania
Emigrants from the Russian Empire to the United States
20th-century American dancers
20th-century American women
21st-century American women